Code of a Killer is a three-part British police drama television series which tells the true story of Alec Jeffreys' discovery of DNA fingerprinting and its introductory use by Detective David Baker in catching the double murderer Colin Pitchfork. Filming commenced in late September 2014, and the program aired on the ITV network, on 6 and 13 April 2015. Endemol Shine handled international distribution of the series.

Plot
Set over a three-year period from 1983 to 1986, DCS David Baker leads an investigation of the vicious murders of the two Leicestershire schoolgirls, Lynda Mann and Dawn Ashworth. Alec Jeffreys at the time was an ambitious scientist who uncovered a remarkable method to read a person's unique DNA finger print. Convinced the murderer was local, Baker approached Jeffreys to utilise his scientific technique as a way to solve the murders. The first ever DNA manhunt and blood testing of many men followed – all in the aid of catching the killer.

Cast

Production

Development
Code of a Killer was commissioned by ITV's Director of Drama Steve November and Controller of Drama Victoria Fea on 16 May 2014. The series was developed with the participation of retired Professor Sir Alec Jeffreys and former Detective Chief Superintendent David Baker. It was written by Michael Crompton, directed by James Strong, produced by Priscilla Parish, and executive produced by Simon Heath for World Productions. Filming began in late September 2014, and the episodes were shown on 6 and 13 April 2015 at 9:00 p.m. on the ITV network.

Broadcast
The series premiered in Australia on BBC First on 19 September 2015.

Episodes

Reception

Critical reception
The drama received a mixed reception. The first part was criticised for dramatic sluggishness and a reliance on crime-show clichés in the portrayal of the two main characters. The depiction of Alec Jeffreys as the stereotypical absent-minded "boffin" was cited by several reviewers. Gerard O'Donovan in The Daily Telegraph called the show's version of him a "stock obsessive boffin so wedded to his lab instruments that his marriage was permanently on the brink of collapse". Julia Raeside in The Guardian wrote, "There are obligatory scenes in which Jeffreys misses a school play and receives a phone call from his wife pronouncing, 'Your dinner’s in the dog.' There are only so many times co-workers can remark, 'Don’t work too late' or 'Aren’t you going home?' before the hammering repetition starts to cause a dent in your enjoyment." Chris Bennion in The Independent concluded that "Sadly this drama had the fingerprints of countless other by-numbers crime thrillers all over it."

Alex Hardy in The Times was less critical, giving the show four stars out of five and saying that "this fact-based drama managed to balance tragedy with optimism", but added that it "inevitably contained elements of soap".

References

External links
 
 Code of a Killer at British TV Detectives

2015 British television series debuts
2015 British television series endings
2010s British drama television series
2010s British crime television series
2010s British television miniseries
ITV television dramas
Television series by World Productions
English-language television shows
Serial drama television series
British television docudramas
Television series set in 1984
Television shows set in England